Diploplecta is a genus of South Pacific dwarf spiders that was first described by Alfred Frank Millidge in 1988.

Species
 it contains nine species, all found in New Zealand:
Diploplecta adjacens Millidge, 1988 – New Zealand
Diploplecta australis (Forster, 1955) – New Zealand (Antipodes Is.)
Diploplecta communis Millidge, 1988 (type) – New Zealand
Diploplecta duplex Millidge, 1988 – New Zealand
Diploplecta nuda Millidge, 1988 – New Zealand
Diploplecta opaca Millidge, 1988 – New Zealand
Diploplecta proxima Millidge, 1988 – New Zealand
Diploplecta pumilio (Urquhart, 1886) – New Zealand
Diploplecta simplex Millidge, 1988 – New Zealand

See also
 List of Linyphiidae species (A–H)

References

Araneomorphae genera
Linyphiidae
Spiders of New Zealand